Shermeen Xin Yi Lim (born 14 May 1989) is a Singaporean international lawn bowler. She is the current Asian women's singles champion, a Southeast Asian Games gold medallist and has represented Singapore at the Commonwealth Games. She has also won three National titles.

In 2018, she won the women's singles at the Asian Lawn Bowls Championship and one year later in 2019, won a gold medal in the triples at the Lawn bowls at the Southeast Asian Games. She was also selected for the cancelled 2020 World Outdoor Bowls Championship.

In 2022, she competed at the 2022 Commonwealth Games in Birmingham, in the women's singles and the women's triples at the Games.

References 

Living people
1989 births
Bowls players at the 2022 Commonwealth Games
Commonwealth Games competitors for Singapore
Southeast Asian Games gold medalists for Singapore
Southeast Asian Games medalists in lawn bowls
Competitors at the 2019 Southeast Asian Games